Pseudoharpax is a genus of African praying mantids in the family Galinthiadidae.

Species
The Mantodea Species File lists:
 Pseudoharpax abyssinicus Beier, 1930
 Pseudoharpax beieri La Greca, 1950
 Pseudoharpax crenaticollis La Greca, 1954
 Pseudoharpax dubius La Greca, 1954
 Pseudoharpax erythraeus Giglio-Tos, 1915
 Pseudoharpax francoisi Bolivar, 1908
 Pseudoharpax nigericus Giglio-Tos, 1915
 Pseudoharpax parallelus La Greca, 1954
 Pseudoharpax ugandanus Giglio-Tos, 1915
 Pseudoharpax virescens Serville, 1839 - type species (P. virescens virescens)

Gallery

References

External links
 

 Galinthiadidae
 Mantodea genera